The Blue Mountain School District is a midsized, rural public school district in Schuylkill County, Pennsylvania. The district is one of the 500 public school districts of Pennsylvania. The district serves the boroughs of Auburn, Cressona, Deer Lake, New Ringgold and Orwigsburg and Wayne Township, East Brunswick Township, North Manheim Township and West Brunswick Township in Schuylkill County.

According to 2000 federal census data, Blue Mountain School District served a resident population of 19,436. By 2010, the district's population was 20,463 people, making it a District of the Third Class. The educational attainment levels for the Blue Mountain School District population (25 years old and over) were 88.6% high school graduates and 22.5% college graduates.

According to the Pennsylvania Budget and Policy Center, 24.1% of the district's pupils lived at 185% or below the Federal Poverty Level  as shown by their eligibility for the federal free or reduced price school meal programs in 2012. In 2009, the Blue Mountain School District residents’ per capita income was $21,212, while the median family income was $36,276. In Schuylkill County, the median household income was $45,012. In the Commonwealth, the median family income was $49,985 and the United States median family income was $49,445, in 2010. By 2013, the median household income in the United States rose to $52,100. In 2014, the median household income in the USA was $53,700.

Blue Mountain School District operates: Blue Mountain High School, Blue Mountain Middle School, Blue Mountain Elementary East, Blue Mountain Elementary West, and Blue Mountain Virtual Academy (founded 2016). School colors are blue and white. Blue Mountain High school students may choose to attend Schuylkill Technology Centers for training in construction and mechanical trades as well as various other careers.. The Schuylkill Intermediate Unit IU29 provides the district with a wide variety of services like: specialized education for disabled students and hearing; speech and visual disability services; mandated training on recognizing and reporting child abuse; background checks for prospective employees and professional development for staff and faculty.

Extracurriculars
Blue Mountain School District offers a variety of activities and interscholastic sports.

Sports
The district funds:

Boys
Baseball – AAAAA
Basketball- AAA
Cross Country – AA
Football – AAA
Golf – AAA
Soccer – AA
Swimming and Diving – AA
Tennis – AA
Track and Field – AAA
Wrestling – AAA

Girls
Basketball – AAAAA
Cheer – AAAA
Cross Country – AA
Soccer (Fall) – AA
Softball – AAA
Swimming and Diving – AA
Girls' Tennis – AA
Track and Field – AAA
Volleyball – AA

Middle School Sports

Boys
Basketball
Cross Country
Soccer
Track and Field
Wrestling	
Football

Girls
Basketball
Cross Country
Softball 
Track and Field

According to PIAA directory July 2013

Controversies
J.S. vs Blue Mountain School District

In early 2006, a 8th grade student made a parody profile of the Blue Mountain Middle School principal, James McGonigle. J.S. had been a honor roll student, until she had worn a camisole under her sweater was deemed against dress code by McGonigle. She was given detention for it after being told multiple times not to wear it. In protest, she had created a myspace account under McGonigles picture. The account had vulgar language and insulted McGonigles family, so once he found out, she was given a 10 day suspention (The longest time period given before expelling her). The account she had created was private, meaning J.S. and her friends were the only people who could access it. Approximately 20 students were given permission to see the profile.

McGonigle had later reported J.S. and her family for harrassment, and it got taken to court. Blue Mountain School District won the first two cases, but lost in the Third Circuit.
James McGonigle DUI 

In September of 2012, James S. McGonigle was arrested for a DUI, his alcohol level was 0.20, legal limit being 0.08. He had opted to go to a Accelerated Rehabilitative Disposition Program.

Rocks in defence of school intruder 

In 2018, Superintendent Dr. David Helsel spoke at a school board meeting in which he said that students were given river stone rocks in the case of a school shooter. He had also said that the district follows the A.L.I.C.E training program.

References

External links
Official website

School districts in Schuylkill County, Pennsylvania